Billey Bluff is a rocky coastal bluff  southwest of Mount Langway in the western part of the Ickes Mountains, Marie Byrd Land. It was mapped by the United States Geological Survey from surveys and from U.S. Navy air photos, 1959–65, and named by the Advisory Committee on Antarctic Names for John P. Billey, an ionospheric physicist who was Scientific Leader at Byrd Station, 1971.

References 

Cliffs of Marie Byrd Land